The Scottish Basketball Championship Women is the national women's basketball league of Scotland.

The league forms the second tier of British women's basketball (inline with the English Basketball League) after the professional setup of the WBBL, where Scotland has one representative, the Caledonia Pride. The governing body of basketball in Scotland is basketballscotland.

The current League and Playoffs champions are the Lady Rocks.

Teams
The line-up for the 2019–20 season features the following teams:

City of Edinburgh Kool Kats
Edinburgh University
Glasgow Fever
Glasgow University
Lady Rocks
Perth Phoenix
Sony Centre Fury
St Mirren
West Lothian Wolves

Seasons
2019–20 Scottish Basketball Championship Women season
2018–19 Scottish Basketball Championship Women season
2017–18 Scottish Basketball Championship Women season
2016–17 Scottish Basketball Championship Women season
2015–16 Scottish Basketball Championship Women season

See also
Scottish Basketball Championship Men

References

External links
 Official Basketball Scotland website
 Scottish league on Eurobasket

 
Scotland
Women's basketball in Scotland
Women
Professional sports leagues in Scotland